Porcellana is a genus of decapod crustaceans in the widespread family Porcellanidae, the porcelain crabs, which superficially resemble true crabs. The genus Porcellana includes the following species:

 Porcellana africana Chace, 1956
 Porcellana cancrisocialis Glassell, 1936
 Porcellana caparti Chace, 1956
 Porcellana corbicola Haig, 1960
 Porcellana curvifrons Yang & Sun, 1990
 Porcellana elegans Chace, 1956
 Porcellana foresti Chace, 1956
 Porcellana habei Miyake, 1961
 Porcellana hancocki Glassell, 1938
 Porcellana lillyae Lemaitre & Campos, 2000
 Porcellana paguriconviva Glassell, 1936
 Porcellana persica Haig, 1966
 Porcellana platycheles (Pennant, 1777)
 Porcellana pulchra Stimpson, 1858
 Porcellana sayana (Leach, 1820)
 Porcellana sigsbeiana A. Milne-Edwards, 1880

References

Porcelain crabs
Decapod genera
Taxa named by Jean-Baptiste Lamarck